Hahncappsia yucatanalis is a moth in the family Crambidae. It is found in Mexico (Yucatán).

The wingspan is about 20 mm.

References

Moths described in 1967
Pyraustinae